"Beat the Odds" is a song by American rapper Lil Tjay, released on August 26, 2022 with an accompanying music video. It was produced by Desirez beats, KBeaZy and KXVI. The song sees Tjay addressing his shooting in June 2022.

Background
On June 22, 2022, Lil Tjay was shot multiple times (7 times) during an attempted robbery in Edgewater, New Jersey. On August 24, he provided an update on his health since his hospitalization in June in a video on Instagram and announced new music. "Beat the Odds" was then released two days later.

Composition
The song has been described as a "florid, melodic track". Lyrically, Lil Tjay recounts his experience of the shooting incident and his recovery, as well as other hard times in his life, especially reflecting on violence-related memories and also being motivated in life by his family.

Music video
A music video for the song was directed by Lil Tjay himself. It opens with audio of 911 calls from the day of the shooting, before showing Tjay laying down and wearing an oxygen mask. The clip features footage of him recovering, writing and recording the song, and being visited by family and friends. He later leaves the hospital in a wheelchair, and is seen in a church expressing gratitude for his survival before returning to the studio.

Charts

Release history

References

2022 singles
2022 songs
Lil Tjay songs
Songs written by Lil Tjay
Columbia Records singles
Songs written by KBeaZy